The 1955 Stanley Cup Finals  was the championship series of the National Hockey League's (NHL) 1954–55 season, and the culmination of the 1955 Stanley Cup playoffs. It was contested between the Montreal Canadiens, appearing in their fifth of ten straight Finals, and the defending champion Detroit Red Wings, in the third Detroit-Montreal Finals series of the 1950s and the second consecutively. The Red Wings won the series, four games to three, for their second consecutive Stanley Cup championship, fourth in six seasons, and seventh overall. Detroit did not win the Stanley Cup again until .

Paths to the Finals
Montreal defeated the Boston Bruins in five games to reach the Finals. Detroit defeated the Toronto Maple Leafs in four games to reach the Finals.

Game summaries
Prior to the playoffs, Montreal's Maurice Richard was suspended and would be missed by the Canadiens.

In the second game, Ted Lindsay scored four goals to set a NHL record for most goals in one game in a Finals series. The win was also the Wings' fifteenth consecutive, another NHL record.

Gordie Howe set two NHL records, amassing 12 points in this round, and surpassing former Canadiens player (and soon-to-be-coach) Toe Blake's point mark for the playoffs with 20 points in 11 games.

Stanley Cup engraving
The 1955 Stanley Cup was presented to Red Wings captain Ted Lindsay by NHL President Clarence Campbell following the Red Wings 3–1 win over the Canadiens in game seven.

The following Red Wings players and staff had their names engraved on the Stanley Cup

1954–55 Detroit Red Wings

Members of Detroit Red Wings Dynasty 1950, 1952, 1954, 1955
Gordie Howe, Red Kelly, Ted Lindsay, Marty Pavelich, Marcel Pronovost, John Wilson (6 Players), Jack Adams, Carl Mattson, Fred Hubert Jr. (3 Non-players).

See also
 1954–55 NHL season

Notes

References

 Podnieks, Andrew; Hockey Hall of Fame (2004). Lord Stanley's Cup. Bolton, Ont.: Fenn Pub. pp 12, 50. 

Stanley Cup
Stanley Cup Finals
Detroit Red Wings games
Montreal Canadiens games
Stanley Cup Finals
Ice hockey competitions in Detroit
Stanley Cup
Stanley Cup Finals
Ice hockey competitions in Montreal
1950s in Montreal
1955 in Quebec
1955 in Detroit